Rockpile AVA is an American Viticultural Area located in Sonoma County, California, northwest of the town of Healdsburg. Established on February 28, 2002, Rockpile AVA was Sonoma County's twelfth designated wine appellation.

See also
 Sonoma County wine
 Wine Country (California)

References

External links

American Viticultural Areas
American Viticultural Areas of California
American Viticultural Areas of the San Francisco Bay Area
Geography of Sonoma County, California
2002 establishments in California